The Little Fourteen-Year-Old Dancer  is a sculpture begun c. 1880 by Edgar Degas of a young student of the Paris Opera Ballet dance school, a Belgian named Marie van Goethem.

Description
The sculpture is one-third life size and was originally sculpted in wax, a somewhat unusual choice of medium for the time. It is dressed in a real bodice, tutu and ballet slippers and has a wig of real hair. All but a hair ribbon and the tutu are covered in wax. The 28 bronze repetitions that appear in museums and galleries around the world today were cast after Degas' death. The tutus worn by the bronzes vary from museum to museum.

The exact relationship between Marie van Goethem and Edgar Degas is a matter of debate. It was common in 1880 for the "Petits Rats" of the Paris Opera to seek protectors from among the wealthy visitors at the back door of the opera.

Realistic wax figures with real hair and real clothes had also been popular in religious, Folk, and fine arts for centuries before Degas created his Little Dancer.

The arms are taut, and the legs and feet are placed in a ballet position akin to fourth position at rest, and there is tension in the pose, an image of a ballerina being put through her paces, not posing in an angelic way. Her face is – "contorted, people thought it was a deliberate image of ugliness, but you could also say it's the image of a sickly gawky adolescent who is being made to do something she doesn't totally want to do."

History
Joris-Karl Huysmans called it "the first truly modern attempt at sculpture I know." Certain critics were shocked by the piece, and the dancer was compared to a monkey and a Mexica. One critic, Paul Mantz, called her the "flower of precocious depravity," with a face "marked by the hateful promise of every vice" and "bearing the signs of a profoundly heinous character." Comparisons with older art were made, perhaps partly because it was exhibited in a glass case, like classical sculpture in the Louvre, and was dressed in wig and clothes.

The casting took place at the Hébrard foundry in Paris from 1920 until 1936 when the Hébrard foundry went bankrupt and closed. Thereafter, "Hébrard" Degas Little Dancer bronzes were cast at the Valsuani foundry in Paris until the mid-1970s. Sixty-nine of Degas' wax sculptures survived the casting process. He stated that he bought the sculpture by accident. That copy was sold for £13,257,250 ($19,077,250) at Sotheby's on February, 3rd 2009. Another Hébrard Little Dancer bronze failed to sell at a November 2011 auction at Christie's.

To construct the statue, Degas used pigmented beeswax, with a metal armature, rope, and paintbrushes covered by clay for structural support.

The Little Dancer wax sculpture we see today is a reworked version of the original sculpture that was shown in 1881. After seeing the wax sculpture in Degas’ living quarters in April 1903, the New York collector Louisine Havemeyer expressed interest in buying the wax. After proposing a bronze or wax cast of the sculpture, which Mrs. Havemeyer refused, Degas took his wax figure upstairs to his working studio and told Vollard he was reworking the sculpture for Havemeyer for 40,000 francs. Degas never sold the sculpture to Mrs. Havemeyer. After Degas died, it was found in a corner of his studio. Paul Lefond, Degas’ biographer, described the Little Dancer wax after Degas’ death as "nothing but a ruin;" and Mary Cassatt telegraphed Mrs. Havemeyer "Statue Bad Condition." However, the wax sculpture we know today is not a ruin. It is Degas' reworked second version of his wax figure. At some point before Degas extensively reworked his sculpture, he allowed a plaster to be cast from the wax figure. This recently re-discovered plaster records the Little Dancer’s original pose, bodice, and hairdo. The plaster is now in a private collection in the United States.

The original wax sculpture was acquired by Paul Mellon in 1956. Beginning in 1985, Mr and Mrs Mellon gave the National Gallery of Art 49 Degas waxes, 10 bronzes and 2 plasters, the largest group of original Degas sculptures. Little Dancer was among the bequests. In 1997, the Airaindor-Valsuani foundry in France began casting a limited edition of Degas bronzes from the pre-1903 Little Dancer plaster. One such Little Dancer bronze is owned by the M.T. Abraham Foundation, which, at times, is lent to other institutions and museums including the State Hermitage Museum in Saint Petersburg, Russia. Like the various states of many of Degas' prints, the Valsuani bronzes record the first version of Degas' Little Dancer, while the Hébrard casts record the second and final state of the sculpture.

Cultural references
In 1998, art historian Richard Kendall published a scholarly account of the history of Degas's sculpture, Degas and the Little Dancer, with contributions by Douglas Druick and Arthur Beale.

A 2003 ballet with choreography by Patrice Bart and music by Denis Levaillant, was premiered by the Paris Opera.

The 2004 BBC Two documentary The Private Life of a Masterpiece: Little Dancer Aged Fourteen closely examines the sculpture, the model, the circumstances of her life, and the critical reaction to the work.

Cathy Marie Buchanan's 2013 novel, The Painted Girls, presents a fictionalised account of the life of Marie van Goethem, the model for the sculpture, as does Carolyn Meyer's young adult novel Marie, Dancing and Laurence Anholt's children's picture book Degas and the Little Dancer.

In 2014, the Kennedy Center for the Performing Arts in Washington, D.C. premiered the stage musical, Little Dancer, inspired by the story of the young ballerina immortalized by Edgar Degas in his famous sculpture. In March 2019 a reworked version of the musical, now called Marie, Dancing Still premiered at the 5th Avenue Theater in Seattle.

In Popular Culture

The sculpture is prominently featured in the 1993 thriller film Malice.

It has recently been featured in the 2020 Netflix drama series Tiny Pretty Things, and in the 2022 HBO original series The Gilded Age, episode Irresistible Change.

References

External links

Little Dancer Aged Fourteen sculpture at the National Gallery of Art.
"Little Dancer Musical Imagines The Story Behind Degas' Mysterious Muse" NPR
The Little Fourteen–Year–Old Dancer sculpture at the Metropolitan Museum of Art.
Little Dancer Aged Fourteen in the Tate Collection, London
Little Dancer aged fourteen in the Robert and Lisa Sainsbury Collection.
The Little Dancer, Aged Fourteen at the Hay Hill Gallery in London.
Degas's Little Dancer at the National Gallery of Art.
The Little Dancer of Fourteen Years at the M.T. Abraham Foundation
Degas: The Artist's Mind, exhibition catalog from The Metropolitan Museum of Art fully available online as PDF, which contains material on Little Dancer of Fourteen Years (see index)
 Little Dancer, The John F.Kennedy Center for the Performing Arts.
"Unraveling the Mysteries of Degas’ ''Little Dancer, Aged Fourteen" YouTube
Little Dancer Aged Fourteen (Degas) - 2 Minute Video | Check123 - Video Encyclopedia

1881 sculptures
Collections of the National Gallery of Art
Dance in art
Portraits of women
Sculptures by Edgar Degas
Wax sculptures